The Nonionidae is a foraminifera family within the order Rotaliida and part of the Nonionacea, shells, or tests, of which are planispiral or trochospiral, calcareous and finely perforate. Includes the Nonioninae, Pulleniinae, Spirotectinae, and Astrononioninae.

References

 A. Loeblich & H. Tappan,1988. Forminiferal Genera and their Classification. e-book 

Foraminifera families
Rotaliida